riddle is Thomas Leeb's first available release and features nine instrumentals and one vocal song.

Track listing

 "riddle"
 "springtime groove"
 "the winds are changing"
 "charlie hunter's"
 "sled dog racing"
 "almbleamal landler"
 "the shearing"
 "the hard can"
 "äkäskero"
 "so do I"

All songs by Thomas Leeb, except 
 "charlie hunter's" (Traditional, arr. Leeb)
 "almbleamal landler" (Traditional, arr. Leeb)
 "the shearing" (Traditional, arr. Leeb)

Personnel

Thomas Leeb – acoustic guitar, vocals
Eric Roche – acoustic guitar, nose brush
Gottfried Gfrerer – acoustic guitar
Eric Spitzer-Marlyn – keyboard, backing vocals, mixing & mastering
Ralf Leeb – cover design

References

1999 albums
Thomas Leeb albums